Denise Lemaire (born November 5, 1956 in Iberville, Quebec) is a former Canadian handball player who competed in the 1976 Summer Olympics.

She was part of the Canadian handball team, which finished sixth in the Olympic tournament. She played four matches and scored seven goals.

References
 profile

1956 births
Living people
People from Saint-Jean-sur-Richelieu
Canadian female handball players
Olympic handball players of Canada
Handball players at the 1976 Summer Olympics
Sportspeople from Quebec
French Quebecers